Shri Rebati Tripura is an Tripuri Indian politician from Tripura and has been elected to the Lok Sabha in 2019 from Tripura East (Lok Sabha constituency) as a National Democratic Alliance candidate. He belongs to Bharatiya Janata Party.

Professional life

Rebati Tripura is currently seeking fund from Union Finance Minister Nirmala Sitharaman to allocate additional funds from the budget to Tripura Tribal Areas Autonomous District Council (TTAADC) for the welfare and development of the ethnic communities of the state.

See also
List of members of the 17th Lok Sabha

References

India MPs 2019–present
Living people
People from Dhalai district
Lok Sabha members from Tripura
1976 births
Bharatiya Janata Party politicians from Tripura
Tripura University alumni